The 2002–03 Dallas Stars season was the Stars' tenth season, 36th overall of the franchise.

Off-season

Regular season
January 20, 2003: In a game against the Dallas Stars, Patrick Roy becomes the first goaltender to appear in 1,000 regular season games. At the end of the game, Marty Turco raised his mask to praise Patrick.

The Stars led all NHL teams in most shutouts for, with 11.

Final standings

Playoffs

Schedule and results

Regular season

|- align="center" 
|1||T||October 9, 2002||1–1 OT|| align="left"| @ Colorado Avalanche (2002–03) ||0–0–1–0 || 
|- align="center" bgcolor="#CCFFCC" 
|2||W||October 11, 2002||4–2 || align="left"|  Mighty Ducks of Anaheim (2002–03) ||1–0–1–0 || 
|- align="center" bgcolor="#CCFFCC" 
|3||W||October 12, 2002||5–2 || align="left"| @ Phoenix Coyotes (2002–03) ||2–0–1–0 || 
|- align="center" bgcolor="#CCFFCC" 
|4||W||October 15, 2002||3–0 || align="left"|  Edmonton Oilers (2002–03) ||3–0–1–0 || 
|- align="center" bgcolor="#FFBBBB"
|5||L||October 17, 2002||1–3 || align="left"| @ Minnesota Wild (2002–03) ||3–1–1–0 || 
|- align="center" bgcolor="#FFBBBB"
|6||L||October 19, 2002||3–5 || align="left"| @ St. Louis Blues (2002–03) ||3–2–1–0 || 
|- align="center" bgcolor="#CCFFCC" 
|7||W||October 20, 2002||5–2 || align="left"|  Washington Capitals (2002–03) ||4–2–1–0 || 
|- align="center" 
|8||T||October 24, 2002||3–3 OT|| align="left"| @ Calgary Flames (2002–03) ||4–2–2–0 || 
|- align="center" bgcolor="#CCFFCC" 
|9||W||October 26, 2002||4–1 || align="left"| @ Vancouver Canucks (2002–03) ||5–2–2–0 || 
|- align="center" bgcolor="#CCFFCC" 
|10||W||October 28, 2002||4–3 OT|| align="left"| @ Edmonton Oilers (2002–03) ||6–2–2–0 || 
|- align="center" bgcolor="#FF6F6F"
|11||OTL||October 30, 2002||2–3 OT|| align="left"|  Florida Panthers (2002–03) ||6–2–2–1 || 
|-

|- align="center" bgcolor="#FFBBBB"
|12||L||November 1, 2002||2–4 || align="left"| @ Columbus Blue Jackets (2002–03) ||6–3–2–1 || 
|- align="center" 
|13||T||November 3, 2002||3–3 OT|| align="left"| @ Detroit Red Wings (2002–03) ||6–3–3–1 || 
|- align="center" bgcolor="#CCFFCC" 
|14||W||November 6, 2002||4–0 || align="left"|  Vancouver Canucks (2002–03) ||7–3–3–1 || 
|- align="center" bgcolor="#CCFFCC" 
|15||W||November 8, 2002||2–1 || align="left"|  Toronto Maple Leafs (2002–03) ||8–3–3–1 || 
|- align="center" bgcolor="#FFBBBB"
|16||L||November 10, 2002||2–3 || align="left"| @ New York Islanders (2002–03) ||8–4–3–1 || 
|- align="center" bgcolor="#CCFFCC" 
|17||W||November 12, 2002||4–2 || align="left"| @ Montreal Canadiens (2002–03) ||9–4–3–1 || 
|- align="center" bgcolor="#CCFFCC" 
|18||W||November 13, 2002||6–1 || align="left"| @ Washington Capitals (2002–03) ||10–4–3–1 || 
|- align="center" bgcolor="#CCFFCC" 
|19||W||November 15, 2002||4–2 || align="left"|  Colorado Avalanche (2002–03) ||11–4–3–1 || 
|- align="center" bgcolor="#CCFFCC" 
|20||W||November 17, 2002||3–2 OT|| align="left"|  Columbus Blue Jackets (2002–03) ||12–4–3–1 || 
|- align="center" 
|21||T||November 20, 2002||2–2 OT|| align="left"| @ Phoenix Coyotes (2002–03) ||12–4–4–1 || 
|- align="center" bgcolor="#CCFFCC" 
|22||W||November 22, 2002||4–0 || align="left"| @ Mighty Ducks of Anaheim (2002–03) ||13–4–4–1 || 
|- align="center" bgcolor="#FFBBBB"
|23||L||November 23, 2002||0–2 || align="left"| @ Los Angeles Kings (2002–03) ||13–5–4–1 || 
|- align="center" bgcolor="#CCFFCC" 
|24||W||November 25, 2002||5–1 || align="left"|  Phoenix Coyotes (2002–03) ||14–5–4–1 || 
|- align="center" bgcolor="#CCFFCC" 
|25||W||November 27, 2002||5–0 || align="left"|  Minnesota Wild (2002–03) ||15–5–4–1 || 
|- align="center" 
|26||T||November 29, 2002||3–3 OT|| align="left"|  New York Rangers (2002–03) ||15–5–5–1 || 
|- align="center" bgcolor="#FFBBBB"
|27||L||November 30, 2002||2–5 || align="left"| @ Nashville Predators (2002–03) ||15–6–5–1 || 
|-

|- align="center" bgcolor="#CCFFCC" 
|28||W||December 4, 2002||5–1 || align="left"|  Montreal Canadiens (2002–03) ||16–6–5–1 || 
|- align="center" 
|29||T||December 6, 2002||3–3 OT|| align="left"|  Detroit Red Wings (2002–03) ||16–6–6–1 || 
|- align="center" bgcolor="#FFBBBB"
|30||L||December 11, 2002||0–3 || align="left"|  Los Angeles Kings (2002–03) ||16–7–6–1 || 
|- align="center" bgcolor="#CCFFCC" 
|31||W||December 13, 2002||3–1 || align="left"|  Atlanta Thrashers (2002–03) ||17–7–6–1 || 
|- align="center" bgcolor="#CCFFCC" 
|32||W||December 15, 2002||5–0 || align="left"| @ Chicago Blackhawks (2002–03) ||18–7–6–1 || 
|- align="center" 
|33||T||December 17, 2002||2–2 OT|| align="left"| @ Philadelphia Flyers (2002–03) ||18–7–7–1 || 
|- align="center" 
|34||T||December 19, 2002||1–1 OT|| align="left"| @ Detroit Red Wings (2002–03) ||18–7–8–1 || 
|- align="center" bgcolor="#FFBBBB"
|35||L||December 21, 2002||3–5 || align="left"| @ New Jersey Devils (2002–03) ||18–8–8–1 || 
|- align="center" bgcolor="#FFBBBB"
|36||L||December 22, 2002||0–1 || align="left"| @ Carolina Hurricanes (2002–03) ||18–9–8–1 || 
|- align="center" bgcolor="#FFBBBB"
|37||L||December 26, 2002||1–3 || align="left"| @ Nashville Predators (2002–03) ||18–10–8–1 || 
|- align="center" bgcolor="#CCFFCC" 
|38||W||December 27, 2002||4–0 || align="left"| @ Florida Panthers (2002–03) ||19–10–8–1 || 
|- align="center" 
|39||T||December 29, 2002||2–2 OT|| align="left"|  Detroit Red Wings (2002–03) ||19–10–9–1 || 
|- align="center" bgcolor="#CCFFCC" 
|40||W||December 31, 2002||4–1 || align="left"|  Edmonton Oilers (2002–03) ||20–10–9–1 || 
|-

|- align="center" bgcolor="#CCFFCC" 
|41||W||January 2, 2003||3–1 || align="left"| @ San Jose Sharks (2002–03) ||21–10–9–1 || 
|- align="center" bgcolor="#CCFFCC" 
|42||W||January 4, 2003||3–2 || align="left"| @ Los Angeles Kings (2002–03) ||22–10–9–1 || 
|- align="center" 
|43||T||January 5, 2003||1–1 OT|| align="left"| @ Mighty Ducks of Anaheim (2002–03) ||22–10–10–1 || 
|- align="center" bgcolor="#CCFFCC" 
|44||W||January 7, 2003||7–4 || align="left"|  Los Angeles Kings (2002–03) ||23–10–10–1 || 
|- align="center" bgcolor="#CCFFCC" 
|45||W||January 9, 2003||4–3 OT|| align="left"|  Chicago Blackhawks (2002–03) ||24–10–10–1 || 
|- align="center" bgcolor="#CCFFCC" 
|46||W||January 11, 2003||6–3 || align="left"|  Colorado Avalanche (2002–03) ||25–10–10–1 || 
|- align="center" bgcolor="#CCFFCC" 
|47||W||January 18, 2003||3–1 || align="left"| @ San Jose Sharks (2002–03) ||26–10–10–1 || 
|- align="center" 
|48||T||January 20, 2003||1–1 OT|| align="left"| @ Colorado Avalanche (2002–03) ||26–10–11–1 || 
|- align="center" bgcolor="#CCFFCC" 
|49||W||January 22, 2003||4–2 || align="left"|  Columbus Blue Jackets (2002–03) ||27–10–11–1 || 
|- align="center" bgcolor="#FFBBBB"
|50||L||January 24, 2003||1–4 || align="left"|  Tampa Bay Lightning (2002–03) ||27–11–11–1 || 
|- align="center" bgcolor="#CCFFCC" 
|51||W||January 25, 2003||4–2 || align="left"| @ St. Louis Blues (2002–03) ||28–11–11–1 || 
|- align="center" bgcolor="#CCFFCC" 
|52||W||January 27, 2003||5–3 || align="left"|  Ottawa Senators (2002–03) ||29–11–11–1 || 
|- align="center" bgcolor="#CCFFCC" 
|53||W||January 29, 2003||4–1 || align="left"|  Calgary Flames (2002–03) ||30–11–11–1 || 
|-

|- align="center" 
|54||T||February 5, 2003||2–2 OT|| align="left"|  St. Louis Blues (2002–03) ||30–11–12–1 || 
|- align="center" bgcolor="#CCFFCC" 
|55||W||February 8, 2003||3–1 || align="left"| @ Phoenix Coyotes (2002–03) ||31–11–12–1 || 
|- align="center" bgcolor="#CCFFCC" 
|56||W||February 9, 2003||3–1 || align="left"|  Los Angeles Kings (2002–03) ||32–11–12–1 || 
|- align="center" bgcolor="#CCFFCC" 
|57||W||February 11, 2003||2–1 OT|| align="left"|  Carolina Hurricanes (2002–03) ||33–11–12–1 || 
|- align="center" bgcolor="#FFBBBB"
|58||L||February 14, 2003||2–4 || align="left"|  Mighty Ducks of Anaheim (2002–03) ||33–12–12–1 || 
|- align="center" bgcolor="#CCFFCC" 
|59||W||February 16, 2003||3–1 || align="left"|  San Jose Sharks (2002–03) ||34–12–12–1 || 
|- align="center" 
|60||T||February 19, 2003||1–1 OT|| align="left"|  Calgary Flames (2002–03) ||34–12–13–1 || 
|- align="center" 
|61||T||February 21, 2003||2–2 OT|| align="left"|  Phoenix Coyotes (2002–03) ||34–12–14–1 || 
|- align="center" bgcolor="#CCFFCC" 
|62||W||February 23, 2003||3–0 || align="left"| @ Chicago Blackhawks (2002–03) ||35–12–14–1 || 
|- align="center" 
|63||T||February 25, 2003||5–5 OT|| align="left"| @ Boston Bruins (2002–03) ||35–12–15–1 || 
|- align="center" bgcolor="#FF6F6F"
|64||OTL||February 27, 2003||2–3 OT|| align="left"| @ Ottawa Senators (2002–03) ||35–12–15–2 || 
|- align="center" bgcolor="#FFBBBB"
|65||L||February 28, 2003||3–5 || align="left"| @ Buffalo Sabres (2002–03) ||35–13–15–2 || 
|-

|- align="center" bgcolor="#CCFFCC" 
|66||W||March 2, 2003||3–1 || align="left"|  Pittsburgh Penguins (2002–03) ||36–13–15–2 || 
|- align="center" bgcolor="#CCFFCC" 
|67||W||March 5, 2003||7–4 || align="left"|  Chicago Blackhawks (2002–03) ||37–13–15–2 || 
|- align="center" bgcolor="#FFBBBB"
|68||L||March 7, 2003||1–2 || align="left"|  Nashville Predators (2002–03) ||37–14–15–2 || 
|- align="center" bgcolor="#CCFFCC" 
|69||W||March 9, 2003||3–0 || align="left"|  San Jose Sharks (2002–03) ||38–14–15–2 || 
|- align="center" bgcolor="#CCFFCC" 
|70||W||March 11, 2003||2–0 || align="left"| @ Columbus Blue Jackets (2002–03) ||39–14–15–2 || 
|- align="center" bgcolor="#FFBBBB"
|71||L||March 12, 2003||2–4 || align="left"| @ Minnesota Wild (2002–03) ||39–15–15–2 || 
|- align="center" bgcolor="#FFBBBB"
|72||L||March 15, 2003||3–4 || align="left"| @ Edmonton Oilers (2002–03) ||39–16–15–2 || 
|- align="center" bgcolor="#FFBBBB"
|73||L||March 17, 2003||2–4 || align="left"|  Vancouver Canucks (2002–03) ||39–17–15–2 || 
|- align="center" bgcolor="#CCFFCC" 
|74||W||March 19, 2003||5–4 OT|| align="left"| @ Atlanta Thrashers (2002–03) ||40–17–15–2 || 
|- align="center" bgcolor="#FF6F6F"
|75||OTL||March 21, 2003||2–3 OT|| align="left"|  Minnesota Wild (2002–03) ||40–17–15–3 || 
|- align="center" bgcolor="#CCFFCC" 
|76||W||March 23, 2003||3–1 || align="left"|  St. Louis Blues (2002–03) ||41–17–15–3 || 
|- align="center" bgcolor="#CCFFCC" 
|77||W||March 25, 2003||4–3 || align="left"| @ Vancouver Canucks (2002–03) ||42–17–15–3 || 
|- align="center" bgcolor="#FF6F6F"
|78||OTL||March 27, 2003||1–2 OT|| align="left"| @ Calgary Flames (2002–03) ||42–17–15–4 || 
|- align="center" bgcolor="#CCFFCC" 
|79||W||March 29, 2003||4–3 || align="left"| @ San Jose Sharks (2002–03) ||43–17–15–4 || 
|- align="center" bgcolor="#CCFFCC" 
|80||W||March 31, 2003||3–0 || align="left"|  Buffalo Sabres (2002–03) ||44–17–15–4 || 
|-

|- align="center" bgcolor="#CCFFCC" 
|81||W||April 2, 2003||2–1 || align="left"|  Mighty Ducks of Anaheim (2002–03) ||45–17–15–4 || 
|- align="center" bgcolor="#CCFFCC" 
|82||W||April 6, 2003||2–0 || align="left"|  Nashville Predators (2002–03) ||46–17–15–4 || 
|-

|-
| Legend:

Playoffs

|- align="center" bgcolor="#FFBBBB" 
|1||L||April 9, 2003||1–2 || align="left"| Edmonton Oilers ||Oilers lead 1–0 || 
|- align="center" bgcolor="#CCFFCC"
|2||W||April 11, 2003||6–1 || align="left"| Edmonton Oilers ||Series tied 1–1 || 
|- align="center" bgcolor="#FFBBBB" 
|3||L||April 13, 2003||2–3 || align="left"| @ Edmonton Oilers ||Oilers lead 2–1 || 
|- align="center" bgcolor="#CCFFCC"
|4||W||April 15, 2003||3–1 || align="left"| @ Edmonton Oilers ||Series tied 2–2 || 
|- align="center" bgcolor="#CCFFCC" 
|5||W||April 17, 2003||5–2 || align="left"| Edmonton Oilers ||Stars lead 3–2 || 
|- align="center" bgcolor="#CCFFCC"
|6||W||April 19, 2003||3–2 || align="left"| @ Edmonton Oilers ||Stars win 4–2 || 
|-

|- align="center" bgcolor="#FFBBBB" 
|1||L||April 24, 2003||3–4 5OT || align="left"| Anaheim Mighty Ducks ||Mighty Ducks lead 1–0 || 
|- align="center" bgcolor="#FFBBBB"
|2||L||April 26, 2003||2–3 OT || align="left"| Anaheim Mighty Ducks ||Mighty Ducks lead 2–0 || 
|- align="center" bgcolor="#CCFFCC" 
|3||W||April 28, 2003||2–1 || align="left"| @ Anaheim Mighty Ducks ||Mighty Ducks lead 2–1 || 
|- align="center" bgcolor="#FFBBBB"
|4||L||April 30, 2003||0–1 || align="left"| @ Anaheim Mighty Ducks ||Mighty Ducks lead 3–1 || 
|- align="center" bgcolor="#CCFFCC" 
|5||W||May 3, 2003||4–1 || align="left"| Anaheim Mighty Ducks ||Mighty Ducks lead 3–2 || 
|- align="center" bgcolor="#FFBBBB"
|6||L||May 5, 2003||3–4 || align="left"| @ Anaheim Mighty Ducks ||Mighty Ducks win 4–2 || 
|-

|-
| Legend:

Player statistics

Scoring
 Position abbreviations: C = Center; D = Defense; G = Goaltender; LW = Left Wing; RW = Right Wing
  = Joined team via a transaction (e.g., trade, waivers, signing) during the season. Stats reflect time with the Stars only.
  = Left team via a transaction (e.g., trade, waivers, release) during the season. Stats reflect time with the Stars only.

Goaltending

Awards and records

Awards

Milestones

Transactions
The Stars were involved in the following transactions from June 14, 2002, the day after the deciding game of the 2002 Stanley Cup Finals, through June 9, 2003, the day of the deciding game of the 2003 Stanley Cup Finals.

Trades

Players acquired

Players lost

Signings

Draft picks
Dallas's draft picks at the 2002 NHL Entry Draft held at the Air Canada Centre in Toronto, Ontario.

See also
2002–03 NHL season

Notes

References

Dall
Dall
Dallas Stars seasons